Don Hoi Lot is a sandbar off the coast of Samut Songkhram Province at the northwestern tip of the Bay of Bangkok. The sediments of the Mae Klong River together sediments from the sea form a system of mudflats, which are populated by razor clams (Solen regularis), which also gave the site its Thai name. The site has the largest population of this species, which is endemic to the northern Gulf of Thailand. Also 18 bird and 42 invertebrate species are recorded at the mudflats and the adjoining coastal mangrove forests. The mudflat Don Nai is on the coast. Nearby, the highly revered shrine of Prince Chumphon Khet-Udomsak attracts Thai visitors.

Since 5 July 2001 the site has been registered as Ramsar site number 1099. Don Hoi Lot is named after the tubular shellfish, known as razor clams or "worm shells" in English. the area covers three kilometres in width and five kilometres long in Tambon Bang Chakreng.

References

External links
Office of National Resources and Environment Policy and Planning on Don Hoi Lot 

Ramsar sites in Thailand
Geography of Samut Songkhram province